José Casimiro Ortíz de la Renta (ca. 1760 – ca. 1830) was Mayor of Ponce, Puerto Rico, during two short periods in 1821.

Background
José Casimiro Ortíz de la Renta was a descendant of the founder of San Germán, on the hills of Santa Marta, next to Río Guanajibo, in 1573. Ortíz de la Renta is best remembered as the Sargento Mayor (Sergeant major) who, with two companies totaling 293 men, provided guard for the defenses of the city of Ponce during the April 1797 British attack on San Juan.

First mayoral term (January 1821)
José Casimiro Ortíz de la Renta was mayor of Ponce starting on 1 January 1821 and until Joaquín Tellechea took over as mayor. During his first mayoral term, Ortiz de la Renta performed as an alcalde constitucional.

Second mayoral term (1821)
José Casimiro Ortíz de la Renta's second (and last) mayoral term in Ponce started upon mayor Joaquín Tellechea's resigning from mayor and lasted until 31 December 1821, at which point mayor José Molina was appointed mayor starting on 1 January 1822. During his second mayoral term, Ortiz de la Renta performed, again, as alcalde constitucional.

References

See also

List of Puerto Ricans
List of mayors of Ponce, Puerto Rico

Mayors of Ponce, Puerto Rico
1760s births
1830s deaths
Year of birth uncertain
Year of death uncertain